The Divine Mercy Shrine is a Catholic monument in El Salvador, Misamis Oriental, Philippines. It features a 50 foot statue of Jesus as the Divine Mercy as the focal point of Divine Mercy Hills, a tract of land overlooking Macajalar Bay on the southern island of Mindanao.

The nine-hectare land for the Shrine was purchased for a nominal amount and the complex was paid for by donations. The shrine was completed in 2008 and serves as a pilgrimage site for Divine Mercy devotees.

Gallery

See also
 List of statues of Jesus
 List of tallest statues
 Divine Mercy Sanctuary (Kraków)
 Cristo Redentor, an iconic statue in Rio de Janeiro, Brazil
 Lux Mundi, a large statue of Christ in the United States of America
 Saint Faustyna Kowalska
 National Shrine of The Divine Mercy, Philippines

References

Catholic pilgrimage sites
Catholic devotions
Mountain monuments and memorials
Colossal statues of Jesus
Buildings and structures in Misamis Oriental
Roman Catholic shrines in the Philippines
Tourist attractions in Misamis Oriental
Divine Mercy